is a Japanese politician and member of the House of Councillors for the Social Democratic Party.

1937 births
Living people
Members of the House of Councillors (Japan)
Politicians from Fukuoka Prefecture
People from Tagawa, Fukuoka
Social Democratic Party (Japan) politicians